Luke Wright (born 1985) is an English cricketer.

Luke Wright may also refer to:

Luke Wright (poet) (born 1982), British poet
Luke Edward Wright (1846–1922), American politician